Kapok tree can refer to several plants  Malvales with one exception  with seeds that grow long hairs:

Bombax ceiba, an Asian tree with red flowers
Calotropis procera (Asterid), a shrub with white and purple flowers, native to Asia and North Africa, but a weed in other places
Ceiba pentandra, a tree of the tropical Americas & West Africa with white flowers, cultivated particularly in south-east Asia for its seed fibre
Two trees with yellow flowers native to northern Australia and Papua New Guinea
Cochlospermum gillivraei
Cochlospermum fraseri